Allium caesium, light blue garlic, is a species of herbaceous perennial flowering plant native to central Asia (Xinjiang, Kazakhstan, Kyrgyzstan, Tajikistan, Uzbekistan).

It produces round bulbs up to 15 mm across. The leaves are round in cross-section, and slightly shorter than the scapes. The flowers are sky-blue. They typically appear in the summer (June to August in England) and attract pollinators such as bees and butterflies. The Latin specific epithet caesium means “grey-blue”.

In cultivation in the UK, this plant has gained the Royal Horticultural Society’s Award of Garden Merit. In the US it is suitable for hardiness zones 4-7.

References

caesium
Onions
Flora of China
Flora of Xinjiang
Flora of Kazakhstan
Flora of Kyrgyzstan
Flora of Tajikistan
Flora of Uzbekistan
Plants described in 1844